This is a list of the National Register of Historic Places listings in Hartley County, Texas.

This is intended to be a complete list of properties and districts listed on the National Register of Historic Places in Hartley County, Texas. There are four properties listed on the National Register in the county. Two of these hold Recorded Texas Historic Landmarks including one property that is a State Antiquities Landmark.

Current listings

The publicly disclosed locations of National Register properties may be seen in a mapping service provided.

|}

See also

National Register of Historic Places listings in Texas
Recorded Texas Historic Landmarks in Hartley County

References

External links

Hartley County, Texas
Hartley County
Buildings and structures in Hartley County, Texas